is a public university in Miyazaki, Miyazaki, Japan, established in 1997. A master's program was added in 2001.

External links
 Official website 

Educational institutions established in 1997
Public universities in Japan
Miyazaki (city)
Universities and colleges in Miyazaki Prefecture
1997 establishments in Japan